Ri Ok-rim (born 14 January 1978) is a North Korean diver. She competed at the 1996 Summer Olympics and the 2000 Summer Olympics.

References

1978 births
Living people
North Korean female divers
Olympic divers of North Korea
Divers at the 1996 Summer Olympics
Divers at the 2000 Summer Olympics
Place of birth missing (living people)
Divers at the 1998 Asian Games
Asian Games competitors for North Korea